The 2018 Ronde van Drenthe was the 56th edition of the Ronde van Drenthe road cycling one day race. It was held on 11 March 2018 as part of the UCI Europe Tour in category 1.HC.

Teams
Twenty-two teams of up to seven riders started the race:

Result

References 

Ronde van Drenthe
Ronde van Drenthe
Ronde van Drenthe